Bembos is a Peruvian fast food chain offering hamburgers, often with Peruvian-influenced variations.

Bembos was established in 1988, with its first restaurant opening in the Miraflores district of Lima. 
Bembos mixes spices into their meat, giving a distinct taste and appearance.  As do other restaurants in Peru (even foreign ones), they serve ají (a pepper-based sauce) on the side.  As their website states, they can be found all over the Lima area, including a two-story one on Caminos del Inca.  They also offer home delivery.

Slogans
 "La mejor hamburguesa y más" (The best burger and more)
 "Como Bembos no hay otra" (There's nothing like Bembos – literally: Like Bembos there's no other)
 "Definitivamente vas a volver" (Definitely you are going to come back)

Stores
The chain has 35 restaurants in 6 cities, mostly in Lima. In July 2007, it had opened a restaurant in the center of Cusco, becoming the first national or international fast food establishment in the city.
 Lima: Miraflores (7), San Isidro (3), Surco (7), San Borja (2), La Molina (1), San Miguel (1), Lima District (1), Chorrillos (1), Jesús María (1), Ate (1) and Independencia (1).  
 Callao:  Callao District (1) and Bellavista (1).
 Cañete: Asia District
 Arequipa: Yanahuara District Av. Emmel (1) Real Plaza (1) Paucarpata District Mall Aventura Plaza (1)    
 Piura: Piura District (1)
 Chiclayo: Chiclayo District (1)
 Cusco: Plaza de Armas (1) Real Plaza (1)
 Trujillo: Mall Aventura Plaza (1) Real Plaza (1)
 Cajamarca: El Quinde Shopping Plaza (1) Real Plaza (1)
Bembos has recently opened restaurants outside of Peru, with two restaurants in Delhi NCR and Mumbai.

In March 2011, Bembos was acquired by the Peruvian group Interbank.

See also 
List of fast-food restaurants
 List of hamburger restaurants

References

Sources

External links 
 Official website

References 

Fast-food hamburger restaurants
Restaurants in Lima
Fast-food franchises
Fast-food chains of Peru
Restaurants established in 1988